Simelane is a surname. Notable people with the surname include:

Constance Simelane, Swazi politician
Israel Simelane, TV and Radio Producer, Eswatini
David Thabo Simelane (born 1956), Swazi serial killer
Eudy Simelane (1977–2008), South African footballer
Lojiba Simelane of Swaziland, Swazi monarch
Menzi Simelane, South African lawyer
Musa Simelane (born 1974), Swazi boxer
Mduduzi 'Magawugawu' Simelane, Politician, Eswatini
Njabuliso Simelane (born 1979), Swazi footballer
Somnjalose Simelane, Swazi monarch
Tiffany Simelane (1988–2009), Swazi beauty queen
Hlengiwe Lucia Simelane  - Mrs Africa Globe 2019, South Africa Beauty Queen, Social Entrepreneur & Activist and UN Global Award Honoree
Bongekile Simelane (known as Babes Wodumo), South African Musician

Hlushwayini tryphina Sithole (1930-2022) Zion Church Founder Swaziland 

Surnames of African origin